The Harlettes, also known as The Staggering Harlettes, is a trio of backup singers who support Bette Midler during her live musical performances.  The Harlettes' line-up has changed many times since their inception.

History

Bette Midler's stage act grew out of her early 1970s performances at the Continental Baths, a gay bathhouse in Manhattan which offered entertainment on the weekends.  With her powerful singing voice, her outrageous costumes and her biting wit, Midler became a favorite of the bathhouse crowd.

Inspired in part by the Theatre of the Ridiculous, Midler's stage show evolved into a bawdy and flamboyant mixture of stand-up comedy, Vaudeville and burlesque. It was during this time that Midler cultivated her stage persona, “The Divine Miss M”. "The more outrageous I was, the more they liked it," says Midler. "It loosened me up."

With the assistance of long-time collaborator and friend Barry Manilow — who at the time was working as a pianist at the Continental Baths — Midler found herself a trio of backup singers, which included pop singer Melissa Manchester. Originally they were called The Red Light District, then M.G.M. (because of the initials of the original members, Melissa, Gail and Merle), but eventually they settled on The Harlettes.

With the support of her sultry Harlettes and the choreography of Toni Basil, Midler's performances became known for their exhausting singing and dance routines. In a 1973 review of one of her shows, Rolling Stone writer Ed McCormack stated: “Watching Bette and the girls work out, the raw awkward sexual energy of it all makes you think of Tina Turner.”  During a single performance Midler and her Harlettes sing everything from wartime radio tunes such as "Boogie Woogie Bugle Boy", Depression-era jazz songs such as "Big Noise From Winnetka", "I Only Have Eyes for You", and "Lullaby of Broadway", to early girl group pop songs such as "Leader of the Pack", "Chapel of Love", and "Da Doo Ron Ron", all while changing in and out of costumes as varied as pink waitress uniforms, sequined gowns and mermaid tails.

Former Harlette Linda Hart was quoted in 2008 as saying that working as a Harlette was "like show business boot camp" and that she learned much from the experience.  Midler was also quoted in 2007 as referring to her relationship to her Harlettes in this way: “We have a great relationship. They adore me and I pay them.”

Special appearances
 Members Melissa Manchester, Gail Kantor and Merle Miller joined Barry Manilow on his 1974 tour following the release of his breakthrough album, Barry Manilow II
 Members Charlotte Crossley, Sharon Redd and Ula Hedwig appeared in the 1978 musical movie Sgt. Pepper's Lonely Hearts Club Band.

Formerly of the Harlettes
 In 1977, three former Harlettes released an LP titled Sharon Redd, Ula Hedwig, Charlotte Crossley - Formerly of the Harlettes with Columbia Records.  This was the group's only album.

Members
Group members are shown in chronological order by date of first appearance.
 Melissa Manchester (1971–1972), actress and singer/songwriter
 Merle Miller (1971–1972, 1977) 
 Gail Kantor (1971–1972) 
 Robin Grean (1972–1975), singer, actress and daughter of producer and composer Charles Randolph Grean
 Sharon Redd (1972–1978), singer 
 Charlotte Crossley (1972–1978)
 Ula Hedwig (1975–1978, 1980, 1982–1983)
 Franny Eisenberg (1978–1980)
 Linda Hart (1978–1980, 1982–1983), actress and singer
 Katey Sagal (1978, 1982–1983), singer, songwriter and actress
 Paulette McWilliams (1979–1980), the original lead singer of Rufus
 Diva Gray (1980)
 Jocelyn Brown (1979–1980), singer
 Joanne Harris (1983)
 Jenifer Lewis (1983–1984), actress and singer
 Siobhan O'Carroll (1983)
 Helena Springs (1983)
 Carol Hatchett (1993–2000, 2015)
 Melanie Taylor (1993–2000), former member of the '80s dance duo Bardeux
 Rhae Ann Theriault (1993–2001)
 Nicolette Hart (2003–2005, 2015)
 Kyra Da Costa (2003–2009, 2015)
 Kamilah (Martin) Marshall (2003–2009)
 Aléna Watters (2007–2008)
 Jordan Ballard (2007–2009)

References

External links
 betteontheboards.com - a Bette Midler fan site with a good magazine archive
 

American female dancers
American dancers
All-female bands
American musical groups